Henry Hartigan VC (March 1826 – 29 October 1886) was born Drumlea, Enniskillen, County Fermanagh and was an Irish recipient of the Victoria Cross, the highest and most prestigious award for gallantry in the face of the enemy that can be awarded to British and Commonwealth forces.

Details
He was about 31 years old, and a Pensioned sergeant in the 9th Lancers, British Army during the Indian Mutiny when the following deeds took place for which he was awarded the VC:

Further information
He later achieved the rank of lieutenant.  He died in Calcutta, India on 29 October 1886.

References

Listed in order of publication year 
The Register of the Victoria Cross (1981, 1988 and 1997)

Ireland's VCs  (Dept of Economic Development, 1995)
Monuments to Courage (David Harvey, 1999)
Irish Winners of the Victoria Cross (Richard Doherty & David Truesdale, 2000)

1826 births
1886 deaths
Military personnel from County Fermanagh
19th-century Irish people
Irish soldiers in the British Army
People from Enniskillen
9th Queen's Royal Lancers soldiers
9th Queen's Royal Lancers officers
Irish recipients of the Victoria Cross
Indian Rebellion of 1857 recipients of the Victoria Cross
British Army recipients of the Victoria Cross